WSBC (1240 AM) is a radio station in Chicago, Illinois, United States, which broadcasts brokered programming. It is owned by Newsweb Corporation.

History

WSBC began broadcasting in 1925 and originally broadcast at 1430 kHz. It was owned by the World Battery Company and its call sign stood for "World Storage Battery Company". It 1926 its frequency was changed to 1040 kHz and in 1927 it was changed to 1260 kHz. It 1928, WSBC's frequency was changed to 1210 kHz and it began sharing time with WCRW and WEDC. Its studios and transmitter were located at the New Southern Hotel (later known as the Hotel Crillon) at 13th and Michigan Ave.

Since WSBC began broadcasting, it has featured a wide variety of ethnic programming. The Sousa Archives and Center for American Music holds the Frank Scheibenreif Slovak, Czech, and Romi Sound Recording Collection, ca. 1930-1950. This collection includes 1,001 recordings, including 753 78-R.P.M., 140 45-R.P.M., and 108 LPs; and one book documenting Eastern Europe music prior to World War II, principally from Czechoslovakia and used by Scheibenreif for the WSBC show, "Slovak American Radio Review."

WSBC hired the nation's first full-time African-American radio announcer, Jack Cooper, who on November 3, 1929, began hosting The All-Negro Hour, a vaudevillesque entertainment program.

On April 1, 1933, Gene Dyer purchased WSBC from C.J. Gordon, who had operated it since August 1932. At the time, Dyer also owned WGES in Chicago. In 1936, the station's studios and transmitter were moved to the West Town State Bank Building at 2400 W. Madison. Its frequency was changed to 1240 kHz in March 1941, as a result of the North American Regional Broadcasting Agreement.

In 1944, WSBC was sold to the J. Miller Advertising Agency for $100,000. In 1954, the station was sold to Louis Lee for $180,000. In 1976, control of the station was passed to Louis Lee's son, Danny Lee.

In 1996, WSBC's owners purchased WCRW for $564,375, plus $160,000 for a non-compete agreement. WEDC ceased broadcasting in 1997. WSBC began broadcasting from WEDC's transmitter site and it began full-time operations.

In 1998, the station was sold to Newsweb Corporation for $5,550,000. Some of the station's programs were simulcast on 1470 WCFJ in Chicago Heights, Illinois. In June 1998, WSBC began airing LesBiGay Radio weekday evenings. The program was heard on WSBC until April 2001, and was simulcast on WCFJ.

References

External links

SBC
Radio stations established in 1925
1925 establishments in Illinois